William Angus MacVicar (born 16 January 1992) is an English former first-class cricketer.

MacVicar was born at Lambeth in January 1992. He was educated at Dulwich College, before going up to Loughborough University. While studying at Loughborough, he made four appearances in first-class cricket for Loughborough MCCU, making two appearances each in 2013 and 2014. He scored 188 runs in his four matches at an average of 31.33, with a high score of 79 which came against Kent in 2014. With his right-arm medium pace bowling he took 3 wickets with best figures of 2 for 46. MacVicar has consistently played second eleven cricket for Kent since 2012, but is yet to feature for the first eleven.

References

External links

1992 births
Living people
People from Lambeth
People educated at Dulwich College
Alumni of Loughborough University
English cricketers
Loughborough MCCU cricketers